There are over 20,000 Grade II* listed buildings in England. This page is a list of these buildings in the district of North Norfolk in Norfolk.

North Norfolk

|}

Notes

External links

North Norfolk
 
North Norfolk